Mycobacterium flavescens is a species of the phylum Actinomycetota (Gram-positive bacteria with high guanine and cytosine content, one of the dominant phyla of all bacteria), belonging to the genus Mycobacterium.

Etymology
Its name is derived from the Latin word "flavescens", which means "becoming golden yellow."

Description
Gram-positive, nonmotile and acid-fast rods.

Colony characteristics
Rough, yellow-orange scotochromogenic, butyrous colonies.

Physiology
Slow growth on Löwenstein-Jensen medium at 25-37 °C, but not at 45 °C within 7–10 days.
Although growth rate is intermediate, metabolic and physiologic properties are more like rapidly growing species.

Differential characteristics
Serologic specificity demonstrated by immunodiffusion.
Related to Mycobacterium fortuitum: can be distinguished by its intense pigment production, and its slow rate of growth.

Pathogenesis
Not associated with disease.  Biosafety level 2.

Type strain
Normal human flora, environmental habitat.
First isolated from a drug treated tuberculous guinea pig (Mexico).
Strain ATCC 14474 = CCUG 29041 = CIP 104533 = DSM 43991 = JCM 12274 = NCTC 10271 = NRRL B-4038.

References

Bojalil et al. 1962. Adansonian classification of mycobacteria. Journal of General Microbiology, 28, 333–346.]

External links
Type strain of Mycobacterium flavescens at BacDive -  the Bacterial Diversity Metadatabase

Acid-fast bacilli
flavescens
Bacteria described in 1962